Lukáš Kužel (born July 22, 1991) is a Czech professional ice hockey defenceman. He played with HC Kladno in the Czech Extraliga during the 2010–11 Czech Extraliga playoffs.

References

External links

1991 births
Czech ice hockey defencemen
Rytíři Kladno players
Living people
LHK Jestřábi Prostějov players
IHC Písek players
HC Berounští Medvědi players
Czech expatriate ice hockey players in Sweden
Sportspeople from Kladno